The Minirail was an automated monorail system on Saint Helen's and Notre Dame islands in Montreal, Quebec, Canada. The network was built for the 1967 World's Fair (Expo 67), and continued to operate for Man and his World. The system consisted of three independent circuits operated by two different types of trains: the larger "Blue" that ran mostly on Notre Dame Island, and the smaller "Yellow" which ran on the north and south ends Saint Helen's Island.

The main circuits of the Minirail ceased service in the early 70's and 80's then demolished shortly after, however the La Ronde "Yellow" loop, segregated from the rest of the system on the north end, remained in service for over a half century. This last vestige of the Minirail was finally demolished in 2022.

Routes
The main part of the system was the "Blue" Minirail on Notre Dame Island (with a small cross over loop on its neighboring island). There were also two smaller loops: the "Yellow" Minirails on opposite ends of Saint Helen's Island.

Notre Dame Island (Blue)
(1967-1973)
The larger Minirail was laid out to pass as many major points as possible. Stations were named for nearby major attractions. The  circuit had six stops at four stations: Metro, Canada, Theme and Agriculture (the latter two stations being served twice). It also ran through the Ontario pavilion and the geodesic dome of the U.S. Pavilion. A section of the Blue line crossed over and ran a small loop on Saint Helen's Island, primarily to connect to the Metro and (south) Yellow Minirail line. The track structure was designed by the Swiss firm of Maschinenfabrik Habegger and fabricated on-site by Dominion Bridge Company. The Blue Minirail continued to operate on Notre Dame Island until late 1973, despite the closure and abandonment of the park below two years earlier. During these final two years there were no stops as all stations on Notre Dame Island were closed, therefore passengers boarded and exited at the Metro Minirail station on Saint Helen's Island. Service ceased by the end of the 1973 season. The circuit itself was dismantled by the mid-1970s, primarily due to construction of the Olympic rowing basin.

Saint Helen's Island (Yellow)
(1967-1981)
The Saint Helen's Island Yellow Minirail ran around a  loop on the south end of the island with two stations: Metro and Place des nation (that connected with the Metro, Blue Minirail, and the Expo Express). After leaving the latter station the route swung over a corner of Swan Lake. Both this and the La Ronde loop were built by Mojan Ltée. It ceased operation when the Saint Helen's Island section of Man and His World closed in late 1981, and then later demolished in the mid-1980s.

La Ronde (Yellow)
(1967-2019)
The La Ronde Yellow Minirail was also on Saint Helen's Island, at its north end, but was completely separate from the rest of the system. It circled the amusement park, and its  route also passed the Marina and ran in between Dolphin Lake and the Saint Lawrence River. It had two stations: Fort Edmonton (nee Pioneerland) and Village. In the mid 80's the track loop behind the Alcan aquarium was removed for construction of the Aqua park, making for a slightly shortened route. The La Ronde Minirail continued to operate for several decades following Expo 67, however after 52 years in service, ceased operation in early 2019. In November 2022, the park began the demolition and removal of the Minirail

Equipment

Blue
Passengers rode in open cars that carried a maximum of 12 people in each. Nine cars made up a single train; one head car, seating only three passengers, seven mid-section cars and one tail car.

Yellow 

The Yellow Minirails received their nicknames from the colour of the cars' canopies. Twelve 16-car trains operated on each line. Each train seated 60 in its  length.
Also designed by Habegger, these cars were built in 1964 for the Swiss National Exhibition held that year in Lausanne. Originally controlled by an on-board operator, they were converted to automatic operation for Expo 67. Additional cars were purchased from the manufacturer, Von Roll Seilbahnen AG.
to replace the rolling stock and rail from Lausanne that were sold to Blackpool's Pleasure Beach.

When Six Flags Corporation took over management of La Ronde at the turn of the century, the company replaced the minirail's eponymous yellow canopies with aqua-green colored ones. Additionally, snack food advertisements relating to the park were affixed to the sides of each Minirail car.

References

External links

 Minirail at La Ronde Official Website
 Novelty Monorails - Expo '67 by David B. Simons Jr.
 Transit History of Montreal, Quebec. All-Time List of Canadian Transit Systems, David A. Wyatt 

Expo 67
La Ronde (amusement park)
Monorails in Canada
People mover systems in Canada
Railway lines opened in 1967
Railways of amusement parks in Canada
Transport in Montreal
Von Roll Holding people movers